Tom Farrell (November 25, 1924 – April 14, 2012) was a Canadian politician. He represented the riding of Humber East in the Newfoundland and Labrador House of Assembly from 1971 to 1979. He was a member of the Progressive Conservatives.

References

Progressive Conservative Party of Newfoundland and Labrador MHAs
2012 deaths
1924 births